Nathan Carter - Live at the Marquee Cork, is Nathan Carter's 10th album and third live album. Unlike Nathan's two previous albums, Christmas Stuff and Beautiful Life, both of which were released by Decca Records, this album was released by Nathan himself via his company 'Nathan Carter Music Group Limited' and distributed by Sharpe Music. The album has peaked at number 9 in Ireland.

Track listing

Personnel
 Nathan Carter: Accordion, Composer, Guitar (Acoustic), Piano, Primary Artist, Vocals
 Derlene Cleary: Vocals (Background)
Nigel Connell: Percussion, Vocals (Background)
 Stevie Hamilton: Banjo, Guitar, Lap Steel Guitar
Roberta Howett: Vocals (Background)
 Gareth Lowry: Drums, Percussion
 Peter Maher: Keyboards, Mixing
 Daniel Martin: Guitar (Acoustic)
 Jim McVeigh: Keyboards, Piano
 John Pettifer: Guitar, Guitar (Acoustic), Vocals
 Seamus Rooney: Bass
 Tom Sheerin: Fiddle, Guitar (Acoustic), Mandolin

Charts

References

2015 live albums
Nathan Carter albums